The 2011 South American Footballer of the Year, given to the best football player in South America by Uruguayan newspaper El País through voting by journalists across the continent, was awarded to Neymar of Santos on December 31, 2011.

Neymar became the second Santos player to win the award.

Rankings

References
General

Specific

External links

2011
Footballer of the Year